Pamela Jo Bondi (born November 17, 1965) is an American attorney, lobbyist, and politician. A Republican, she served as the 37th Florida attorney general from 2011 to 2019, the first woman elected to the office.

In 2020, Bondi was one of President Donald Trump's defense lawyers during his first impeachment trial.

Early life and education
Bondi's hometown is Temple Terrace, Florida. Her father, Joseph Bondi, was a city council member and then Mayor of Temple Terrace. She is a graduate of C. Leon King High School in Tampa. Bondi graduated from the University of Florida in 1987 with a degree in Criminal Justice and was a member of Delta Delta Delta sorority. She earned a JD from  Stetson Law School in 1990 and was admitted to the Florida Bar on June 24, 1991.

Career
Bondi acted as a prosecutor and spokeswoman in Hillsborough County, Florida, where she was an Assistant State Attorney. Bondi resigned this position to seek the office of Attorney General of Florida. She has made guest appearances on Scarborough Country with Joe Scarborough and various other cable news programming on MSNBC and worked for Fox News as a guest host.

Bondi prosecuted former Major League Baseball player Dwight Gooden in 2006 for violating the terms of his probation and for substance abuse.  In 2007, Bondi also prosecuted the defendants in Martin Anderson's death.

Attorney General 

In 2010, Bondi defeated Democratic State Senator Dan Gelber by a 55% to 41% margin to become the first female Attorney General of the State of Florida.

Bondi was the lead attorney general in an unsuccessful lawsuit seeking to overturn the Patient Protection and Affordable Care Act in Florida et al v. United States Department of Health and Human Services. In the lawsuit the State of Florida and 26 other states argued that the individual mandate provision of the ACA violates the United States Constitution. In 2018, Bondi joined with 19 other Republican-led states in a lawsuit to overturn the ACA's bans on health insurance companies charging people with pre-existing conditions higher premiums or denying them coverage outright.

In 2013, Bondi persuaded Governor Rick Scott to postpone a scheduled execution because it conflicted with a fundraising event. After questions were raised in the media, Bondi apologized for moving the execution date.

Bondi was re-elected in November 2014, receiving 55% of the vote. Her challenger George Sheldon, the former acting commissioner of the Administration for Children and Families, received 42%.

Bondi opposed same-sex marriage and other LGBT rights issues on behalf of the state. Following the 2016 Orlando nightclub shooting in June 2016, Bondi was interviewed by CNN reporter Anderson Cooper, who said that Bondi's expression of support for the LGBT community was at odds with her past record. Cooper said that Bondi was "either mistaken or not telling the truth," while Bondi accused Cooper of fomenting "anger and hate."

In August 2018, while still serving as Florida Attorney General, Bondi co-hosted The Five on Fox News three days in a row while also appearing on Sean Hannity's Fox News show. Fox News claimed that the Florida Commission on Ethics had approved Bondi's appearance on the program; however, spokeswoman for the commission denied that, telling the Tampa Bay Times that no decision was made by the commission and that the commission's general counsel did not make a determination whether or not Bondi's appearance as a host violated the Florida Code of Ethics. The Tampa Bay Times described it as "unprecedented" for a sitting elected official to host a TV show.

Fundraising controversies
Beginning in 2010, Bondi's association with Scientology and the multiple fundraisers that wealthy Scientologists have organized for Bondi's political campaigns have provoked controversy. Bondi has justified those contacts and her speeches before leading Scientologists by arguing that the group wishes to help her crack down on human trafficking.

In 2011, Bondi also pressured two attorneys to resign who were investigating Lender Processing Services, a financial services company now known as Black Knight, following the robosigning scandal, as part of their work for Florida's Economic Crime Division. After the resignations, Bondi received campaign contributions from Lender Processing Services, though she denied any quid pro quo.

In 2013, Bondi also received criticism following a campaign donation from Donald Trump. Prior to the donation, Bondi had received at least 22 fraud complaints regarding Trump University. A spokesperson for Bondi announced that her office was considering joining a lawsuit initiated by Eric Schneiderman, the Attorney General of New York, regarding tax fraud potential charges against Trump. Four days later, however, a political action committee established by Bondi to support her re-election, And Justice for All, received a $25,000 donation from the Donald J. Trump Foundation, after which Bondi declined to join the lawsuit against Trump University. Both Bondi and Trump defended the propriety of the nonprofit foundation's political donation.

In 2016, after Citizens for Responsibility and Ethics in Washington filed a complaint with the Internal Revenue Service regarding the 2013 Trump donation, the Trump Foundation stated that the donation had been made in error. It said that the Foundation had intended for the donation to go not to Bondi's PAC, but instead to an unrelated Kansas non-profit called Justice for All. However, in June 2016, as Bondi was facing renewed criticism over the Trump donation and her decision not to join the lawsuit, her spokesman said that Bondi had solicited the donation directly from Trump several weeks before her office announced it was considering joining the lawsuit against him. On March 14, 2016, Bondi endorsed Trump in the 2016 Florida Republican presidential primary, saying she has been friends with Trump for many years. In June 2016, a spokesperson for Governor Rick Scott stated that the state's ethics commission is looking into the matter, though nothing further came from the investigation.

In September 2016, the IRS determined that the donation to Bondi's PAC violated laws against political contributions from nonprofit organizations, and ordered Trump to pay a fine for the contribution. Trump also was required to reimburse the foundation for the sum that had been donated to Bondi. Neither Bondi nor her PAC were fined or criminally charged. In November 2019, Trump was ordered by a New York state court to close down the foundation and pay $2 million in damages for misusing it, including the illegal donation to Bondi.

In 2021, The Daily Beast reported that it obtained records relating to Trump's illegal donation to Bondi, which show that Trump's organization knew that the money was being given to a PAC in Florida rather than a Kansas non-profit. The records include an email in August 2013 from Bondi's campaign finance director Deborah Ramsey Aleksander to Trump’s executive assistant, Rhona Graff, identifying the PAC as an Electioneering Communications Organization and thanking Graff for meeting with her, for the promised $25,000 donation, and "for always being so responsive and wonderful to work with". A spokesperson for Citizens for Responsibility and Ethics in Washington called these documents "a smoking gun" that destroys the story that Trump and Bondi had concocted to excuse the donation.

Association with Donald Trump 

In 2016, Bondi gave a speech at the Republican National Convention, during which she led "Lock her up" chants directed at the Democratic nominee Hillary Clinton. In 2019, after her final term as Florida attorney general, Bondi was hired by Ballard Partners, a firm with close ties to Trump, and she began working as a registered lobbyist for Qatar. In November 2019, she was hired by the Trump administration to help the White House during Trump's first impeachment proceedings, being given special Government employee status, allowing Bondi to continue working for the Arab lobby. Her position was described the following month as being to "attack the process" of the impeachment inquiry. On January 17, 2020, Bondi was named as part of Trump's defense team for the Senate impeachment trial.

During the course of the impeachment trial, Bondi made debunked allegations that former Vice President Joe Biden and his son Hunter Biden were involved in corruption in Ukraine, stemming from Hunter Biden's position on board of Burisma Holdings. It was also revealed that Lev Parnas, a businessman with close ties to Rudy Giuliani and Ukraine, had several meetings with Bondi in 2018 while she was the Florida Attorney General, and after she left office in 2019. In 2019, Parnas was arrested and accused of illegally funneling foreign money from Ukrainians and Russians to Republican politicians, particularly in Florida, where he lived.

Bondi spoke in support of Trump at the 2020 Republican National Convention.

While ballots were being counted in the 2020 United States presidential election, Bondi supported Trump's baseless claims that there was large-scale voter fraud in Georgia, Pennsylvania, and Wisconsin. In an appearance on Fox News on November 5, 2020, host Steve Doocy challenged Bondi to provide evidence for her claims of fraud, to which she refused. Bondi later claimed that Trump had won Pennsylvania, despite votes there still being counted, with his opponent Joe Biden ultimately winning the state.

During the following lame-duck session, Trump appointed Bondi to the board of trustees of the John F. Kennedy Center for the Performing Arts. The Palm Beach Post described the appointment as a reward for her loyalty to Trump.

Personal life
Bondi married Garret Barnes in 1990; the couple divorced after 22 months of marriage. In 1996, Bondi married Scott Fitzgerald; they divorced in 2002. She was engaged to Greg Henderson in 2012. She is a member of the Junior League.

Electoral history

See also

 Impeachment inquiry against Donald Trump
 List of female state attorneys general in the United States

References

External links

 Pam Bondi for Attorney General (Campaign website - not found on 1/31/2019)
 

1965 births
21st-century American politicians
21st-century American women politicians
2016 United States presidential electors
American prosecutors
American women lawyers
American lawyers
C. Leon King High School alumni
Florida Attorneys General
Florida lawyers
Florida Republicans
Living people
Politicians from Tampa, Florida
People from Temple Terrace, Florida
Stetson University College of Law alumni
University of Florida College of Liberal Arts and Sciences alumni
Women in Florida politics
Members of the Junior League
American people of Italian descent
Members of the defense counsel for the first impeachment trial of Donald Trump